The Parish of Collector is a parish of Argyle County located to the north of Lake George.

It contains the town of Collector. The Federal Highway runs through the parish from south-west to north-east.

References
New South Wales Parish maps preservation project

Parish Of Collecror Compiles by Warren Young

This is a collection of articles on the Private Village of Collector settled -
<>javascript:;</>

Parishes of Argyle County